The Dorset Senior Cup is a knockout cup competition involving association football teams from the county of Dorset, England, affiliated with the Dorset County Football Association. The current holders of the Dorset Senior Cup are Poole Town who beat Hamworthy United 2–1 after extra time in the final on 1 March 2022 at the County Ground, Hamworthy.

The competition is open to all affiliated clubs at step 7 and above of the national league system. They must also have floodlights at their home grounds. The county FA headquarters is located at the County Ground in Hamworthy near Poole.

Previous winners

References

External links
Football Club History Database: Dorset Senior Cup

Football in Dorset
County Cup competitions